Argynnaceae is a genus of fungi within the Argynnaceae family.

References

External links 
 Argynnaceae at Index Fungorum

Dothideomycetes enigmatic taxa
Dothideomycetes genera